Stráž pod Ralskem (until 1946 Vartenberk) is a town in Česká Lípa District in the Liberec Region of the Czech Republic. It has about 3,800 inhabitants.

Etymology
The local castle was called Wartenberg (Warte auf Berge meant "guard on the hill" in German). Vartenberk was the Czech transcription of the name. The modern Czech name of the town 'Stráž means literally "guard", pod Ralskem'' refers to its location below Ralsko Mountain.

Geography
It lies in the Ralsko Uplands.

The Ploučnice River flows through the town. The town lies on the shores of Stráž pod Ralskem Reservoir. It was built in 1911–1913 and is one of the oldest reservoirs in the country. There are also several ponds around the town.

History

The first written mention is from 1283, when a castle was built here. The castle and the settlement were called Wartenberg and their owners became known as Wartenberg family. In 1504, the Wartenberg family sold the manor to Bartholomew Hirschpergar, who rebuilt the Gothic castle to a chateau.

At the end of the 19th century, tourism began to develop and Stráž pod Ralskem turned into a resort. In 1963, uranium ore was found and tourism has partly given way to industrialization. The uranium ore mining ended in 1996.

Demographics

Economy

Stráž pod Ralskem is known for its jailhouse. It was created in 1973 from the original hostels that were used for uranium mine workers. It employs around 300 people.

Notable people
Heinrich Ignaz Franz Biber (1644–1704), Czech-Austrian baroque composer
Anton von Jaksch (1810–1887), Czech-Austrian physician, rector of Charles University

References

External links

 

Populated places in Česká Lípa District
Cities and towns in the Czech Republic